The name Sugarloaf or Sugar Loaf applies to numerous raised topographic landforms worldwide: mountains, hills, peaks, summits, buttes, ridges, rock formations, bornhardt, inselberg, etc. Landforms resembling the characteristic conical shape of a sugarloaf were often so named. 



Australia
 Mount Sugarloaf (New South Wales)
 Sugarloaf Peak and Sugarloaf Saddle in Cathedral Range, Victoria
 Mt Sugarloaf, a peak on Mount Leura, Victoria
 Mt Sugarloaf, in Kinglake National Park
 Sugarloaf, in Mount Buangor State Park
 Mt Sugarloaf, peak in the Pyrete Range of Lerderderg State Park, Victoria
 The Sugarloaf, Hallett Cove, South Australia

Brazil
 Sugarloaf Mountain (Pão de Açúcar), in Rio de Janeiro

Canada
 Sugarloaf Mountain (New Brunswick)
 Wilkie Sugar Loaf in Nova Scotia
 Pain de Sucre ("Sugarloaf") summit of Mont Saint-Hilaire, Quebec
 Mount Cheminis or Mont Chaudron on the Quebec-Ontario border
 Sugarloaf Mountain, Nanaimo, British Columbia

Ireland
 Great Sugar Loaf, a 501 m peak in east County Wicklow
 Little Sugar Loaf, a 342 m peak in east County Wicklow
 Sugarloaf (County Cork), a 574 m peak near Glengarriff in County Cork
 Sugarloaf (West Wicklow), a 552 m peak in west County Wicklow
 Sugarloaf Hill (Knockmealdowns), a 663 m peak in the Knockmealdowns in County Waterford

New Zealand
 Mount Sugarloaf (1238m), by Lake Heron, South Island, New Zealand 
 Sugar Loaf Islands, near New Plymouth
 Sugarloaf (Christchurch), a peak in the Port Hills with a prominent transmission tower

Norway 
 Sukkertoppen ("Sugarloaf peak"), a 314m mountain on the island of Hessa in Ålesund, Norway

Philippines
 Pan de Azucar Island in Iloilo province

Sierra Leone
 Sugar Loaf (Freetown) is a mountain on the edge of the capital city

United Kingdom
 Sugar Loaf, Carmarthenshire, Wales
 Sugar Loaf, Monmouthshire, Wales
 Sugarloaf Hill, Malvern, England
 Sugarloaf Hill, Folkestone Downs, England

United States

 Sugar Loaf Mountain (Alaska)
 Sugarloaf Mountain (Cleburne County, Arkansas)
 Sugarloaf Mountain (Arizona)
 Sugarloaf Mountain (Butte County, California)
 Sugarloaf Mountain (Riverside County, California)
 Sugarloaf Mountain (San Bernardino County, California)
 Sugarloaf Mountain (San Mateo, California)
 Sugarloaf Ridge, situated in Sugarloaf Ridge State Park in Sonoma County, California
 Sugarloaf Mountain (Boulder County, Colorado) 
 Sugarloaf Mountain (Florida), the highest point of peninsular Florida
 Sugarloaf Mountain (Rowan County, Kentucky)
 Sugarloaf Mountain (Franklin County, Maine)
 Sugarloaf Mountain (Maryland)
 Sugarloaf Mountain (Franklin County, Massachusetts)
 Sugarloaf Mountain (Marquette, Michigan)
 Sugar Loaf (Mackinac Island), a rock formation on Mackinac Island in Michigan
 Sugar Loaf (Winona, Minnesota)
 Sugarloaf (New York)
 Sugarloaf Hill (Putnam County, New York), and Sugarloaf Mountain (Dutchess County, New York), two adjacent peaks in the Hudson Highlands of New York
 Sugarloaf Mountain (Greene County, New York), one of the Catskill High Peaks
 Sugarloaf Mountain (Webb, New York), in the Town of Webb in Herkimer County, New York
 Sugar Loaf Mountain (Orange County, New York)
 Sugarloaf Mountain (Rutherford County, North Carolina)
 Sugarloaf (Geauga County, Ohio), one of the highest points of Northeast Ohio
 Sugarloaf Mountain (Ross County, Ohio), situated in Great Seal State Park, located in Chillicothe, Ohio
 Sugar Loaf Mountain (Oklahoma), summit with the most prominence in the state
 Sugarloaf Mountain (Pennsylvania), inside the eponymous Sugarloaf Township of Luzerne County
 Sugarloaf Mountain (South Carolina), near Patrick,(Chesterfield County, South Carolina)
 Sugarloaf Mountain (El Paso, Texas) in the Franklin Mountains State Park
 Sugarloaf Mountain (Utah), a mountain near the Alta Ski Area outside of Salt Lake City, Utah
 Sugarloaf Mountain (Wyoming), in the Snowy Range.
 Sugarloaf Mountain (Vermont), a prominence southeast of Sugarbush Resort.

Uruguay
 Cerro Pan de Azúcar (Sugarloaf Hill), Maldonado

See also
 For the Battle of Sugar Loaf Hill, see Battle of Okinawa
 Sugarloaf (New Zealand), communications tower at Port Hills, Christchurch

References